The Staten Island Railway (formerly known as the Staten Island Rapid Transit) is a rapid transit system on Staten Island, New York. Its operator has been the Metropolitan Transportation Authority of New York since 1971, whereas prior to that year it was owned by the Baltimore & Ohio Railroad (B&O).

Main Line
This list contains all stations currently operating on the Staten Island Railway (SIR). All active SIR stations are located on the Main Line, which spans from the St. George Ferry Terminal to Tottenville. Stations tend to be built either above ground level on embankments or are open-cut stations built below ground level, but open to the sky.

Disused and former stations 
The majority of former stations are located on the North Shore Branch and South Beach Branch, which were closed to passenger service at midnight on Tuesday, March 31, 1953. A small western portion of the North Shore Branch that is disconnected to the Main Line is used for freight service, and a smaller eastern portion of the same branch provided seasonal service to the Richmond County Bank Ballpark station from 2001 to 2009. Restoration is being discussed along this mostly abandoned  line as part of the Staten Island light rail plan. The South Beach Branch was abandoned and demolished except for a remaining stanchion on St. John's Avenue and the Robin Road Trestle. This  line diverged from the Main Line south of the Clifton station and lay to the east of the Main Line.

See also

References

External links 
 SIRT Track Map on nycsubway.org

 
Staten Island
SIR
Railway stations